The 1986 Seattle Seahawks season was the team's 11th season with the National Football League (NFL). Despite posting a 10–6 record and having a dominant 5-game win streak to close out the season, the Seahawks missed the playoffs.

1986 NFL Draft

Personnel

Staff

 Head athletic trainer - Jim Whitesel
 Assistant athletic trainer - John Kasik

Final roster

 Starters in bold.
 (*) Denotes players that were selected for the 1987 Pro Bowl.

Schedule

Preseason

Source: Seahawks Media Guides

Regular season
Divisional matchups have the AFC West playing the NFC East.

Bold indicates division opponents.
Source: 1986 NFL season results

Standings

Game Summaries
Even though the Seahawks did not qualify for the playoffs, their most memorable moment during the season was Steve Largent breaking Harold Carmichael's NFL record for consecutive games with at least one reception in a 33-7 victory on Monday Night Football against the Chargers.

Preseason

Week P1: vs. Indianapolis Colts

Week P2: at Detroit Lions

Week P3: vs. Minnesota Vikings

Week P4: at San Francisco 49ers

Regular season

Week 1: vs. Pittsburgh Steelers

Week 2: vs. Kansas City Chiefs

Week 3: at New England Patriots

Week 4: at Washington Redskins

Week 5: vs. San Diego Chargers

Week 6: at Los Angeles Raiders

Week 7: vs. New York Giants

Week 8: at Denver Broncos

Week 9: vs. New York Jets

Week 10: at Kansas City Chiefs

Week 11: at Cincinnati Bengals

Week 12: vs. Philadelphia Eagles

Week 13: at Dallas Cowboys

Week 14: vs. Los Angeles Raiders

Week 15: at San Diego Chargers

Week 16: vs. Denver Broncos

References

External links
 Seahawks draft history at NFL.com
 1986 NFL season results at NFL.com

Seattle
Seattle Seahawks seasons